"Imma Put It on Her" is the first single from the American R&B boy band Day26's second studio album, Forever in a Day. It features Diddy and Yung Joc. Willie Taylor, Robert Curry, & Que share lead vocals, with Brian Angel and Big Mike providing ad libs.

Song information
The song was produced by Blaze "The Champ" and was released digitally on iTunes on March 31, 2009, with a pre-order of the album Forever in a Day. Though a leaked version of the song containing only Day26 had been leaked in late February 2009, the updated album version features Diddy and Yung Joc. The song was written by Day26.

Music video
A video for the song was shot i early March 2009 in Miami, Florida, with director Rage and was released on April 2, 2009, on Day-26.com and Mtv.com. It ranked at #77 on BET's Notarized: Top 100 Videos of 2009 countdown.

Official versions
Album version
Radio Edit
Instrumental
Capo Decina Remix

Chart information
Since its release on the iTunes Store, the song has reached #5 on the R&B/Soul chart and #55 on the Top 100 Songs chart.

The single entered the Billboard Hot R&B/Hip-Hop Songs chart at number 98 on the issue date of April 11, 2009. The following week it entered on the Billboard Bubbling Under Hot 100 Singles chart at number 11 which equates to 111 on the Billboard Hot 100.

The song went on to peak at #79 on the Billboard Hot 100 and #29 on the Billboard R&B/Hip-Hop Songs and Airplay charts.

Weekly charts

Year-end charts

References

2008 singles
Sean Combs songs
Yung Joc songs
Bad Boy Records singles
Music videos directed by Dale Resteghini

pt:Got Me Going